Michael William Muchlinski  (born February 26, 1977) is an American Major League Baseball umpire. He umpired his first Major League game on April 24, 2006, and was officially hired by MLB prior to the 2014 season.

Umpiring career 
Muchlinski officiated behind the plate on August 5, 2011, for a benches-clearing brawl between the Philadelphia Phillies and the San Francisco Giants. He ejected Phillies center fielder Shane Victorino, Giants catcher Eli Whiteside, and Giants pitcher Ramón Ramírez from the game.

Muchlinski was the first base umpire on June 13, 2012, when Giants pitcher Matt Cain threw a perfect game against the Houston Astros.

Muchlinski was the home plate umpire on June 20, 2015, when Washington Nationals pitcher Max Scherzer pitched a no-hitter against the Pittsburgh Pirates. Scherzer had a perfect game with two outs in the ninth inning and a 2–2 count on José Tábata. Tábata appeared to lean into Scherzer's eighth pitch of the at bat, controversially ruled a hit by pitch by Muchlinski.

See also 

 List of Major League Baseball umpires

References

External links 
Retrosheet
Close Call Sports

1977 births
Living people
Major League Baseball umpires
Sportspeople from Tacoma, Washington